Parr was launched in 1797 at Liverpool as a slave ship in the triangular trade in enslaved people. She was lost in 1798 in an explosion on her first voyage.

Origins
Parr was built in Liverpool and named for owners Thomas and John Parr, members of an eminent local slave-trading family. She was built to accommodate seven hundred slaves. Parr was not only the largest Liverpool slaver, but at 566 tons (bm), the largest vessel in the entire British trans-Atlantic slave trade.

Voyage and loss
Lloyd's Register for 1797 had a Parr, 450 tons (bm), of Liverpool, Christian, master.

Captain David Christian acquired a letter of marque on 5 December 1797, and sailed for the Bight of Biafra and Gulf of Guinea Islands on 5 February 1798; he gathered his slaves at Bonny Island. 

Lloyd's List reported that Parr, Christian, master, caught fire and blew up in 1798, off the coast of Africa as she was sailing from there for the West Indies. Twenty-nine of her crew and some 200–300 slaves were saved.  Christian died in the explosion. (Two or three years earlier he had been master of  when she too had caught fire while gathering slaves.) Other records indicate that Parr had a crew of 97 men and had embarked some 200 slaves. The surviving slaves were shipped on other vessels.

In 1798, 25 British slave ships were lost. Twelve of the losses occurred on the coast of Africa.

Citations and references
Citations

References
 
 

1797 ships
Ships built in England
Liverpool slave ships
Age of Sail merchant ships of England
Maritime incidents in 1798
Maritime incidents involving slave ships
Ship fires
Shipwrecks of Africa
Shipwrecks in the Atlantic Ocean